A non-secure tenancy is a type of tenancy under Part VII of the United Kingdom Housing Act 1996. They are usually granted where a Council has a duty to a homeless person.

See also
Secure tenancy

References

Tenancies in the United Kingdom